This was a parliamentary by-election for the British House of Commons constituency of Stourbridge. Stourbridge was one of the Worcestershire constituencies, bordering Bewdley, where the Conservative Prime Minister, Stanley Baldwin sat.

Vacancy 
Douglas Pielou who had been the Unionist MP here since 1922, died on 9 January 1927, at the age of 39, causing the by-election.

Electoral history 
Pielou had gained the seat in 1922 from the Liberals. Since then, Labour had emerged as the main challenger, finishing a close second at the last General election in 1924;

Candidates 

The Unionist candidate chosen to defend the seat was 47-year-old Henry Hogbin. He had served briefly as the Liberal MP for Battersea South from 1923-24. At the 1924 election he had been defeated standing as a Constitutionalist despite the support of both Unionist and Liberal local Associations. 
The Labour candidate was 50-year-old pacifist Wilfred Wellock. He was contesting the seat for the third time, having lost on the previous two occasions. He was imprisoned as a conscientious objector in the First World War.
The local Liberal association selected 41 year-old Aneurin John Glyn Edwards as their candidate. Edwards had traveled the country as a Factory Inspector.  He then worked as a Barrister on the North Wales and Chester circuits. He was standing as a Liberal candidate for parliament for the fourth time, having contested; West Bromwich in 1922 and 1923 and Cardiff Central in 1924.

Campaign
Polling day was set for 23 February 1927, forty-five days after the death of Pielou, allowing for a reasonably lengthy campaign.

Result 
Labour gained the seat from the Unionists;

Aftermath 
Wellock stood again here at the next General Election and was re-elected. Hogbin did not stand again. Edwards contested Burnley and finished third.

References

1929 elections in the United Kingdom
1929 in England
By-elections to the Parliament of the United Kingdom in Worcestershire constituencies
By-Election, 1929
Politics of Dudley